In mathematics, specifically in order theory and functional analysis, a normed lattice is a topological vector lattice that is also a normed space whose unit ball is a solid set. 
Normed lattices are important in the theory of topological vector lattices. They are closely related to Banach vector lattices, which are normed vector lattices that are also Banach spaces.

Properties 

Every normed lattice is a locally convex vector lattice.

The strong dual of a normed lattice is a Banach lattice with respect to the dual norm and canonical order. 
If it is also a Banach space then its continuous dual space is equal to its order dual.

Examples 

Every Banach lattice is a normed lattice.

See also

References

Bibliography

  
  

Functional analysis